Cyclohexylamine is an organic compound, belonging to the aliphatic amine class. It is a colorless liquid, although, like many amines, samples are often colored due to contaminants. It has a fishy odor and is miscible with water. Like other amines, it is a weak base, compared to strong bases such as NaOH, but it is a stronger base than its aromatic analog, aniline.

It is a useful intermediate in the production of many other organic compounds (e.g. cyclamate)

Preparation
Cyclohexylamine is produced by two routes, the main one being the complete hydrogenation of aniline using some cobalt- or nickel-based catalysts:
C6H5NH2  +  3 H2  →  C6H11NH2
It is also prepared by alkylation of ammonia using cyclohexanol.

Applications

Cyclohexylamine is used as an intermediate in synthesis of other organic compounds. It is the precursor to sulfenamide-based reagents used as accelerators for vulcanization. It is a building block for pharmaceuticals (e.g., mucolytics, analgesics, and bronchodilators). The amine itself is an effective corrosion inhibitor. The herbicide hexazinone and the anesthetic hexylcaine are derived from cyclohexylamine. It has been used as a flushing aid in the printing ink industry.

Toxicity
Cyclohexylamine has a low acute toxicity with LD50 (rat; p.o.) = 0.71 ml/kg Like other amines, it is corrosive. 

Cyclohexylamine is listed as an extremely hazardous substance as defined by Section 302 of the U.S. Emergency Planning and Community Right-to-Know Act. The National Institute for Occupational Safety and Health has suggested workers not be exposed to a recommended exposure limit of over 10 ppm (40 mg/m3) over an eight-hour workshift.

References

Amines
Cyclohexyl compounds